The Taylor state by-election, 1994 was held on 5 November 1994 in the South Australian House of Assembly electorate of Taylor, centred on Paralowie in the northern suburbs of Adelaide. The by-election was triggered by the resignation of state Labor MHA and former Premier, Lynn Arnold, on 21 September 1994. The newly-created seat had been won by Arnold at the 1993 state election with a primary vote of 51.06 percent.

Timeline 
 21 September 1994
Arnold resigned, vacating the seat of Taylor.

 6 October 1994
Writ issued by Speaker of the House of Assembly for an by-election in Taylor.

 21 October 1994, at noon
Close of nominations and draw for positions on the ballot paper.

 5 November 1994
Polling day, between the hours of 8am and 6pm.

Results
The Liberal Party and the Democrats, who contested the previous election and gained 36.62 percent and 12.32 percent of the vote respectively, did not run candidates in the by-election. Labor easily retained the seat.

See also
List of South Australian state by-elections

References 

Taylor state by-election
South Australian state by-elections
1990s in South Australia
Taylor state by-election